IRC v Wimbledon Football Club Ltd [2004] EWCA Civ 655 is a UK insolvency law case, concerning Company Voluntary Arrangements.

Facts
Wimbledon FC put forward a Company Voluntary Arrangement. It said Football Creditors should be paid everything, while preferential creditors, including HMRC would get 30 pence in the pound. If the Football Creditors were not paid in full under league rules, the team could not continue to play in the League. The administrators argued this would frustrate the purpose of the sale, and mean there would be nothing at all to pay the Inland Revenue. The Football Creditors were to be paid from funds provided by the club purchaser under the sale agreement, without reducing the price paid for the club itself.

Judgment
Court of Appeal held there was no infringement of Insolvency Act 1986 section 4(4). If payment had reduced the price, there would have, because then in substance, funds would have come from the company, and the CVA would have had to have been revoked.

See also

UK insolvency law

Notes

References

United Kingdom insolvency case law
United Kingdom taxation case law
2004 in British law
2004 in case law
Court of Appeal (England and Wales) cases